Snoop Dogg's Doggystyle is a mixed hardcore pornography and hip-hop music video featuring the music of rapper Snoop Dogg and presented by him. It was released in 2001. It was the first hardcore video ever listed on the Billboard music video sales chart.  Because of its huge success, it started a trend where rappers are put into the mainstream of the porn industry by hosting X-rated films. Many films of the genre followed, starring Necro, Mystikal, Too Short, Ice-T and Yukmouth. It also allowed Hustler to expand its boundaries by launching new subsidiaries for their recently formed fashion line and CD label. The scenes were shot at Snoop Dogg's house in Claremont, California. Snoop Dogg himself however, does not appear nude or perform any explicit acts.

Credits
Porn performers include:
 Obsession
 Mark Anthony
 India
 Tony Eveready
 Charlie Angel
 Jade Marcela
 Bronze
 Cuba Demoan
 Farrah
 Kaire
 Anna Malle
 Mr. Marcus
 Jack Napier

Video dancers include:
 Carla Harvey
 Lenore
 Petro
 Moet
 Essence
 Caramel
 Diva Blue
 Alize

Snoop Dogg's entourage includes:
 Xzibit
 Rappin' 4-Tay
 Tray Deee
 Goldie Loc
 Nate Dogg
 Soopafly
 DJ Jam
 Uncle Junebug
 Tha Locs

Featured songs
Several songs from Snoop Dogg Presents Tha Eastsidaz (2000): 
"Pussy Sells", "Dogghouse", "G'd Up", "Now We Lay 'Em Down", "Tha G In Deee", "Give It 2 'Em Dogg" and "Tha Eastsidaz"

Other songs:
"In Love with a Thug" and "Don't Tell"  from No Limit Top Dogg (1999)
"Brake Fluid (Biiittch Pump Yo Brakes)" from Tha Last Meal (2000)

Four exclusive songs:
"Let's Roll" - Goldie Loc feat. Snoop Dogg (samples "Billie Jean" by Michael Jackson)
"One More Switch"
"Fatal Attraction"
"Nigga Sayin' Hi"

Awards

Charts

See also
 Snoop Dogg's Hustlaz: Diary of a Pimp
 Snoop Dogg filmography, pornographic movies

References

External links
 
 
 

2000s pornographic films
2001 films
Snoop Dogg video albums
Interracial pornographic films
Films shot in Los Angeles County, California
Films set in Los Angeles County, California
2000s English-language films